Davisson is a lunar impact crater that is located on the far side of the Moon from the Earth. This crater lies across the eastern rim of the huge walled plain Leibnitz, and the rim and outer rampart intrudes into the interior floor of Leibnitz. To the east-northeast of Davisson is the walled plain Oppenheimer, a formation only somewhat smaller than Leibnitz.

The rim of Davisson has been somewhat eroded from impacts, but it retains some detail from its original formation. Particularly along the western face, the interior wall displays some terraces. The rim is more worn along the northeastern face, and the rim is more irregular to the north and south. The interior floor is relatively level and featureless, with a low central peak offset slightly to the southwest of the crater midpoint.

This crater is named after Clinton Joseph Davisson (1881–1958) a US physicist who in 1927 made the first experimental observation of the wave nature of electrons, for which he was awarded the Nobel Prize for Physics in 1937.  With Lester Germer (1896–1971), Davisson discovered that electrons can undergo diffraction, in accordance with French physicist Louis de Broglie's theory that electrons and all other elementary particles can show wavelike behaviour.

Prior to formal naming in 1970 by the IAU, the crater was known as Crater 377.

References

 
 
 
 
 
 
 
 
 
 
 
 

Impact craters on the Moon